A Woman With a Bad Reputation ( "Imraah sayiah al-samah") is a 1973 Egyptian film directed by Henry Barakat and starring Shams al-Baroudi.

Plot
A young man asks his wife to dance with his boss at a party. The woman gets into an affair with the boss and commits infidelity. Her marriage dissolves and her life worsens. Her son has an illness, so the wife is forced to accept gifts from the boss.

Lisa Anderson of the Chicago Tribune. uses the film as an example of more liberal filmmaking in Egypt prior to an increase in social conservatism in society. At the party in the beginning of the film, the women wear hot pants and miniskirts. The partygoers dance, smoke cigarettes, and drink alcohol. None of the women are in hijab.

Cast
 Shams al-Baroudi
 Yousuf Shaaban 
 Salama Elias
 Nagwa Fouad
 Emad Hamdy
 George Sidhom

See also

 Cinema of Egypt

References
 Armes, Roy. Dictionary of African Filmmakers. Indiana University Press, July 11, 2008. .

Notes

Egyptian drama films
1973 films
Films directed by Henry Barakat